The Gemeentelijk Sportpark Kaalheide is a stadium situated in Kerkrade, Netherlands. It is the former stadium of Roda JC, who since 2000 play in the Parkstad Limburg Stadion. It is still in use for youth and Jong Roda JC (U21) matches.

Defunct football venues in the Netherlands
Sports venues in Limburg (Netherlands)
Gemeentelijk Sportpark Kaalheide
Roda JC Kerkrade
Sports venues completed in 1950